Business Bhutan  is Bhutan's only financial newspaper.  A weekly paper, written mainly in English with a Dzongkha language section, focuses on business, finance, and politics in Bhutan.

External links
Business Bhutan — official website
Business Bhutan — Facebook page

Sources
 Business Bhutan is Launched
 Journalists Association of Bhutan

References 

Newspapers published in Bhutan
English-language newspapers published in Asia
Dzongkha-language newspapers
Newspapers established in 2009
2009 establishments in Bhutan
Business newspapers